João Carlos Sacramento Ramos (born 12 May 1986), known as Jony Ramos or simply Jony, is a professional footballer who plays as a forward for Championnat National 3 club Ivry. Born in Portugal, he represents São Tomé and Príncipe at international level.

International career 
Jony is a member of the São Tomé and Príncipe national team. He made his international debut on 5 September 2015. He also appeared in the 2018 FIFA World Cup qualification first round matches against Morocco.

References

External links 
 
 
 

1986 births
Living people
Portuguese people of São Tomé and Príncipe descent
People with acquired São Tomé and Príncipe citizenship
Footballers from Lisbon
Portuguese footballers
São Tomé and Príncipe footballers
Association football forwards
Atlético S.C. players
São Tomé and Príncipe international footballers
Portuguese expatriate footballers
São Tomé and Príncipe expatriate footballers
Portuguese expatriate sportspeople in France
São Tomé and Príncipe expatriate sportspeople in France
Expatriate footballers in France
C.D. Pinhalnovense players
US Lusitanos Saint-Maur players
US Ivry players
Championnat National 3 players
Championnat National 2 players